The 2019 FIVB Volleyball Girls' U18 World Championship is the sixteenth edition of the FIVB Volleyball Girls' U18 World Championship, contested by the women's national teams under the age of 18 of the members of the  (FIVB), the sport's global governing body. The final tournament was held in Egypt from 5 to 14 September 2019. Egypt were chosen as the hosts for this event for the first time.

The finals involve 20 teams, of which 19 came through qualifying competitions, while the host nation qualified automatically. Of the 20 teams, 13 had also appeared in the previous tournament in 2017, while Cameroon and DR Congo made their first appearances at a FIVB Volleyball Girls' U18 World Championship.

Italy are the defending champions, having won their second title in Argentina.

Qualification
A total of 20 teams qualify for the final tournament. In addition to Egypt who qualified automatically as hosts, the other 19 teams qualify from five separate continental competitions.

1.Teams that will make their debut.

Draw
Teams were seeded in the first two positions of each pool following the Serpentine system according to their FIVB World Ranking as of 1 January 2019. FIVB reserved the right to seed the hosts as heads of pool A regardless of the World Ranking. All teams not seeded were drawn to take other available positions in the remaining lines following the World Ranking. Each pool had no more than three teams from the same confederation. The draw was held in Cairo, Egypt on 1 July 2019. Rankings as of 1 January 2019 are shown in brackets, except the hosts Egypt who ranked 14th.

Pools composition

Squads

Venues

Referees

Pool standing procedure
 Number of matches won
 Match points
 Sets ratio
 Points ratio
 If the tie continues as per the point ratio between two teams, the priority will be given to the team which won the last match between them. When the tie in points ratio is between three or more teams, a new classification of these teams in the terms of points 1, 2 and 3 will be made taking into consideration only the matches in which they were opposed to each other.
Match won 3–0 or 3–1: 3 match points for the winner, 0 match points for the loser
Match won 3–2: 2 match points for the winner, 1 match point for the loser

Preliminary round
All times are Egypt Standard Time (UTC+02:00).

Pool A

|}

|}

Pool B

|}

|}

Pool C

|}

|}

Pool D

|}

|}

Final round

17th–20th places

|}

|}

Final sixteen

Round of 16

|}

Quarterfinals

|}

Semifinals

|}

3rd place match

|}

Final

|}

5th–8th places

5th–8th semifinals

|}

7th place match

|}

5th place match

|}

9th–16th places

9th–16th quarterfinals

|}

13th–16th semifinals

|}

9th–12th semifinals

|}

15th place match

|}

13th place match

|}

11th place match

|}

9th place match

|}

Final standing

Awards

Most Valuable Player
  Jessica Mruzik
Best Setter
  Kennedi Orr
Best Outside Spikers
  Ana Cristina de Souza
  Oghosasere Omoruyi

Best Middle Blockers
  Devyn Robinson
  Emma Graziani
Best Opposite Spiker:
  Giorgia Frosini
Best Libero
  Zhu Xingchen

See also
2019 FIVB Volleyball Boys' U19 World Championship

References

External links
Official website

FIVB Volleyball Girls' U18 World Championship
FIVB Volleyball Girls' U18 World Championship
FIVB Volleyball Girls' U18 World Championship
International volleyball competitions hosted by Egypt
2019 in Egyptian sport